Artisan's House is a historic home located at Annapolis, Maryland, United States.  It is a -story frame house on a brick foundation representative of modest middle class dwellings of the 18th century.  It was likely used as a barracks during the Revolutionary War. Because of this, it is also known as "Hogshead."

It was listed on the National Register of Historic Places in 1973, and it is a contributing property in the Colonial Annapolis Historic District.

Hogshead is owned by the Historic Annapolis Foundation and operated as an 18th-century period historic house museum with Colonial-era re-enactors.

References

External links
Hogshead - Historic Annapolis Foundation
, including photo from 1982, at Maryland Historical Trust

Houses on the National Register of Historic Places in Maryland
Houses completed in 1777
Houses in Annapolis, Maryland
Museums in Annapolis, Maryland
Historic house museums in Maryland
Individually listed contributing properties to historic districts on the National Register in Maryland
National Register of Historic Places in Annapolis, Maryland
Historic district contributing properties in Maryland
1777 establishments in Maryland